Larkrise Primary School is a coeducational primary school located in East Oxford in the English county of Oxfordshire. It is located near to Greyfriars Catholic School.

Larkrise opened in April 1972, admitting children from the infant school of Donnington Council School. The buildings were hit by a major fire in 1973.

Larkrise became an academy on 1 February 2019, joining the River Learning Trust.

It runs 2 classes for each year, with 30 children in each.

References

External links
 Larkrise Primary School

Schools in Oxford
Primary schools in Oxfordshire
Educational institutions established in 1972
1972 establishments in England
Academies in Oxfordshire